This is a list of official overseas visits and Commonwealth tours made by the Prince and Princess of Wales. Prince William, as a child, first traveled with his parents on official visits and tours. Now he is one of the United Kingdom's most important ambassadors; sometimes the Duke travels overseas as a representative of the UK. His wife, Catherine, began undertaking official trips upon joining the British royal family in 2011, and has since accompanied him on visits and conducted her own overseas engagements on behalf of the UK. The Prince and Princess also undertake tours of Commonwealth realms, of which William's father is king, as his representatives or as members of the realm's royal family.

Summary of official overseas visits

William 

 One visit: Afghanistan, Akrotiri and Dhekelia, The Bahamas, Belize, Bhutan, Botswana, China, Denmark, Finland, India, Ireland, Israel, Jamaica, Japan, Lesotho, Kuwait, Malaysia, Malta, Namibia, Norway, Oman, Pakistan, Palestine, Poland, Singapore, Solomon Islands, South Africa, Sweden, Tanzania, Tuvalu, Vietnam
 Two visits: Italy, Kenya, United Arab Emirates
 Three visits: Germany, Switzerland, United States
 Four visits: Australia, Belgium, Canada
 Six visits: France, New Zealand

Catherine

Solo visits 

 One visit: Denmark, Luxembourg, Netherlands

Accompanying William 

 One visit: Akrotiri and Dhekelia, Australia, The Bahamas, Belize, Bhutan, Denmark, Germany, India, Ireland, Jamaica, Malaysia, New Zealand, Norway, Pakistan, Poland, Singapore, Solomon Islands, Sweden, Tuvalu
 Two visits: Canada, Belgium
 Three visits: France, United States

List of official overseas visits

See also
List of state visits made by Elizabeth II
List of Commonwealth visits made by Elizabeth II
List of official overseas trips made by Charles III

References

Foreign relations of the United Kingdom
William, Duke of Cambridge
Overseas trips
State visits by British leaders
William, Duke of Cambridge
William, Duke of Cambridge